Misa Urqu (Quechua misa table, urqu mountain, literally "table mountain", Hispanicized spelling Mesaorjo) is a mountain in the Andes of Peru, about  high. It is located in the Ayacucho Region, Lucanas Province, on the border of the districts of Aucara and Cabana. Misa Urqu lies northeast of the archaeological site of Usqunta and east of Misa Q'asa.

References

Mountains of Peru
Mountains of Ayacucho Region